John Hays Hammond Jr. (April 13, 1888 – February 12, 1965) was an American inventor known as "The Father of Radio Control". Hammond's pioneering developments in electronic remote control  are the foundation for all modern radio remote control devices, including modern missile guidance systems, unmanned aerial vehicles (UAVs), and the unmanned combat aerial vehicle (UCAVs). Of Hammond's many individual inventions, the inventions which have seen the most significant application are the variable pitch or controlled pitch propellers and single dial radio tuning. He was the son of mining engineer John Hays Hammond, Sr.

Biography
Born in San Francisco, California, he and his family moved to South Africa and the Transvaal in 1893. His father was active as a mining engineer for Cecil Rhodes' mines in South Africa.  In 1898, the family moved to England, where young Hammond fell in love with castles and life in earlier times.  The family returned to the United States at the turn of the 20th century.

At the age of twelve, Hammond accompanied his father on a business trip to Thomas Edison’s laboratory in West Orange, New Jersey. Upon being introduced to Edison, the boy asked so many questions that the inventor gave him a personal tour of the complex and assumed the role of mentor. The two would remain in contact for the rest of Edison’s life. While studying at the Sheffield Scientific School of Yale University, Hammond became interested in the new study of radio waves and he was taken under the wing of Alexander Graham Bell. Bell also became his mentor and the two would remain close friends until Bell’s death.

After graduation from Yale in 1910, Hammond took a job in the U.S. Patent Office. His strategy was simple: having learned from Edison that "inventing had to be a money-making proposition, where better to learn what fields were up-and-coming than in the Patent Office?" After he became an authority on the patent process, he founded the Hammond Radio Research Laboratory on his father's estate in Gloucester, Massachusetts. In total, he is credited with more than 800 foreign and domestic patents on more than 400 inventions (the exact number of inventions is vague due to how credit was listed on the forms) mostly in the fields of radio control and naval weaponry.

He served on the Board of Directors of RCA and a listing of his professional colleagues and society friends reads like a Who’s Who  of the rich and famous. Aside from his inherited wealth, his inventions brought Hammond an additional fortune. Between the years 1926 and 1929, he built a castle (including a drawbridge) which became his home, laboratory, and a showplace for his collection of Roman, medieval, and Renaissance artifacts. Hammond was also interested in the mechanism and workings of the pipe organ, and had a huge organ installed in the castle's Great Hall.  Famous organists, including Richard Ellsasser and Virgil Fox, performed and made commercial recordings on this instrument, unfortunately no longer in operating condition (2015).  Overlooking Gloucester Harbor in the North Shore region of Massachusetts, Hammond Castle is now a museum which offers self-guided tours throughout half the year and hosts fundraising events on a regular basis.

Hammond was awarded the Edward Longstreth Medal from The Franklin Institute in Philadelphia, Pennsylvania in 1959.

Personal life

Hammond married Gloucester resident, artist, and devout spiritualist Irene Fenton in 1925. In addition to his marriage, Hammond was part of a homosexual/pansexual circle surrounding A. Piatt Andrew, actor Leslie Buswell, and interior designer Henry Davis Sleeper, referring to the B.A.S.H. acronym often referenced in Gloucester culture (B.A.S.H. standing for Buswell, Andrew, Sleeper, and Hammond).

In popular culture

His castle was investigated by TAPS in 2012 for paranormal activity and this was shown on the TV show Ghost Hunters.

Hammond Castle was also featured on the PBS Reality Show FETCH! with Ruff Ruffman in Season One.

Inventions 

Examples of Hammond's 400+ U.S. patents:

10/21/1919 – System of Teledynamic Control (1,275,741) 
5/20/1922 – System for Radio Control of Moving Bodies (1,420,258) 
11/6/1928 – Submarine sound transmission (1,500,243) 
3/18/1929 – Multi-channel radio system (1,717,662) 
12/29/1931 – Secret Radio Communication (1,838,762) 
5/19/1931 – Paravane Torpedo (1,806,346) 
12/14/1936 – Gaseous Detector of Radiant Energy (1,610,371) 
5/27/1941 – Variable Pitch Propeller Control (2,243,095) 
7/11/1944 – Radio Alarm System (2,343,499)

See also
 Nikola Tesla - friend of Hammond
 Natalie Hays Hammond (1904–1985), artist and inventor of a form of appliqué, was the sister of John Hays Hammond, Jr.
 Richard Pindle Hammond (1896-1980), composer of orchestral and chamber music, was the brother of John Hays Hammond, Jr.

References

Further reading
 Dandola, John Living in the Past, Looking to the Future: The Biography of John Hays Hammond, Jr., Quincannon Pub Group, 2004.
 Dandola, John Living in the Past, Looking to the Future: The Biography of John Hays Hammond, Jr., Addendum, Quincannon Pub Group, 2020.

External links

Hammond Castle Museum Official Website
 John Hays Hammond, Jr. papers (MS 863). Manuscripts and Archives, Yale University Library. 
The Infography of John Hays Hammond Jr.
Biography of John Hays Hammond Jr.
 
 
1941 Illustrated Story of John Hammond Jr.

1888 births
1965 deaths
People from San Francisco
IEEE Medal of Honor recipients
Yale School of Engineering & Applied Science alumni
People from Gloucester, Massachusetts
20th-century American inventors